Agama persimilis, the painted agama, is a species of lizard in the family Agamidae. It is a small lizard found in Somalia, Ethiopia, and Kenya.

References

Agama (genus)
Reptiles described in 1942
Taxa named by Hampton Wildman Parker